One of three major definitions used in state parity laws.

New Jersey

Under Timothy's Law the following disorders are classified as biologically based mental illness:

Schizophrenia/psychotic disorder 
Major depression 
Bipolar disorder 
Delusional disorders 
Panic Disorder 
Obsessive Compulsive Disorder 
Bulimia 
Anorexia

References

Mental health law in the United States
Mental disorders